Caffee Junction, also known as Coffey Junction, Greeley, Martaban, and Rickey, is an unincorporated community in Tuscaloosa County, Alabama, United States.

History
The community was originally known as Greeley for the Horace Greeley school located there. A post office operated under the name Rickey from 1902 to 1904, and under the name Greeley from 1904 to 1929. The Tennessee Coal, Iron and Railroad Company operated an iron ore mine in Caffee Junction.

References

Unincorporated communities in Tuscaloosa County, Alabama
Unincorporated communities in Alabama